Mehdi Bajestani (born January 12, 1975) is an Iranian actor. He is best known for his performance as Saeed Hanaee in the crime thriller Holy Spider (2022).

Career 
He is member of the Naqshineh Theatre group.

Filmography

Film 
 Thirteen (2003) short film, directed by Vahid Rahbani 
 There Are Things You Don't Know (2010), directed by Fardin Saheb Zamani
 Resident of the Middle Floor (2014), directed by Shahab Hosseini
 Sweet Taste of Imagination (2015), directed by Kamal Tabrizi
 Mahrokh's House (2021), directed by Shahram Ebrahimi
 Holy Spider (2022), directed by Ali Abbasi

Television 

 Whisper (2018) tv series, directed by Ebrahim Sheibani

Theatre 

The Caucasian Chalk Circle, 1997, by Bertolt Brecht, directed by Hamid Samandarian, Tehran.
 Waiting for Godot (1998), by Samuel Beckett, directed by Vahid Rahbani, Tehran and Paris.
 Rhinoceros (2001), by Eugène Ionesco, directed by Vahid Rahbani, Tehran.
 Poor Bitos (2002), by Jean Anouilh, directed by Hamid Mozaffari, Tehran.
 Like Blood for Steak (2004), by Mohammad Charmshir, directed by Hassan Majooni, Tehran.
 The Unexpected Man, 2005, by Yasmina Reza, directed by Vahid Rahbani, Tehran.
 Julius Caesar, Told by a Nightmare, (2045), by Naghmeh Samini, directed by, Kioomars Moradi, Tehran.
 The Invisible Cities (2005), by Akbar Alizad, directed by Hassan Majoni, Tehran.
 Eleutheria (2005), by Samuel Beckett, directed by Vahid Rahbani, and Mohammad Reza Jozi Tehran.
 Don Camillo (2006), written and directed by Kourosh Narimani, Tehran.

References

External links 
 
 Biography from Naqshineh Theatre

1975 births
20th-century Iranian male actors
Iranian male stage actors
Living people
21st-century Iranian male actors
Iranian male film actors